Vítor Alves Benite (born February 20, 1990), commonly known as Vítor Benite, or simply as Benite, is a Brazilian-Italian professional basketball player for Gran Canaria of the Spanish Liga ACB and EuroCup. At a height of 1.94 m (6'4 ") tall, he plays at the shooting guard position. He also represents the senior Brazilian national basketball team.

Early life
Benite was born in Jundiaí, in São Paulo state. His father, Francisco Carlos Benite, was an engineer, and he moved the family to Rio de Janeiro for a new job. There, the young Benite was spotted by Boleta, the coach of Flamengo, while Benite was playing with his brothers. Boleta brought the boys to the Flamengo athletic club, where Benite started his youth career in 1997. Benite would attend school in the morning and play basketball in the afternoon. When he was a few years older, Benite continued his youth career in Campinas, playing at Clube de Regatas Campinas. He finished his amateur youth career with Rio Claro Futebol Clube.

Professional career
After the end of his youth career with Ulbra/Rio Claro, Benite was signed by Pinheiros, joining the team for the first season (2009) of competition for the newly created Novo Basquete Brasil (NBB), the top tier of Brazilian basketball. The following two years Benite played for Franca.

2009–10 season
In his first season playing for Franca, Benite proved to be a great player. Because of his great matches, he was nominated for the NBB Revelation Player award, but Raulzinho won the award. This achievement helped Raulzinho to reach to Brazil national basketball team.

2010–11 season: The new Brazilian jewel
In his second season in Franca, Benite made his best season, when he helped his team to reach to the final series of the championship. But Franca did not support the strength of the future champion Brasília and became runner-up. Despite the defeat, Benite was chosen the NBB Sixth Man of the Year, the NBB Most Improved Player and the NBB Revelation Player. After his great season, Benite was chosen by the Argentine coach Rubén Magnano to play the 2011 FIBA Americas Championship for Brazil national basketball team. After two seasons in Franca, Benite moved to Limeira.

2011–12 season: Moving to Limeira
Arriving in Limeira, Benite adopted the speech he wanted to play as point guard. His beginning season was excellent. Benite led his team to a great position in championship. But it did not last until the end of the season and Limeira ranked ninth place. In the playoffs, Limeira was defeated by Joinville.

2012–13 season: The arrival at Flamengo and the first championship
With the end of the season, Benite moved to Flamengo, where he started his career. The arrival of Benite and arrivals from other players like Marquinhos, Olivinha, Kojo Mensah and Shilton dos Santos the club from Gávea gave to the group the status of super-team, a team formed only by stars and became the main contender for the NBB. In the state championship, Flamengo didn't have to reach its eighth consecutive title, which was conquered unbeaten. In Liga Sudamericana, Benite and his teammates reached the Final Four, defeated Regatas Corrientes and Peñarol Mar del Plata, but lost to Brasília, which prevented the title that got the team from Corrientes.

In FIBA Americas League, Flamengo qualified for the semifinals, with great performances from Benite. But in the semifinals, the team went through its worst season and lost all three matches, finishing last in the group.

But the NBB, the story was totally different. The coach led by José Neto impose a sequence of 20 consecutive victories, only being defeated in the second round of the regular season. Benite was chosen to play the NBB All-Star Game for the third consecutive time, but due to an injury, he has no much time in the court. Recovered from his injury, Benite returned to play great matches . Flamengo finished the first stage in the first place, and in the playoffs, eliminated Paulistano, São José to reach the final of the championship. But in the week of the Final, Benite he felt the same injury that had left out a few games in the first round. Benite not played the Final, but it was very important to give support to his teammates . Benite saw his team once again be national champion. A great season Benite earned him his return to Brazil national team, to play 2013 FIBA Americas Championship.

2018–present
On July 23, 2018, he signed with Cedevita. Benite later signed with San Pablo Burgos. He averaged 13.5 points per game during the 2019–20 season, and re-signed with the team on July 16, 2020. In October 2020, he won the 2019–20 Basketball Champions League with Burgos.

On August 5, 2022, he has signed with Gran Canaria of the Spanish Liga ACB.

National team career
Benite has been a member of the senior Brazilian national basketball team. With Brazil, he has played at the following major tournaments: the 2011 FIBA AmeriCup, the 2012 FIBA South American Championship, the 2013 FIBA AmeriCup, the 2014 FIBA South American Championship, the 2015 Pan American Games, the 2015 FIBA AmeriCup, and the 2016 Summer Olympics. He won the silver medal at the 2011 FIBA AmeriCup, the bronze medal at the 2014 FIBA South American Championship, and the gold medal at the 2015 Pan American Games.

NBB career statistics

NBB regular season

NBB playoffs

Awards and accomplishments
3× NBB champion: (2013, 2014, 2015)
 NBB Sixth Man of the Year: (2011)
 NBB Most Improved Player: (2011)
 NBB Revelation Player: (2011)
 3× NBB All-Star: (2011, 2012, 2013)

References

External links
FIBA Profile
EuroCup Profile
Spanish League Profile 
LatinBasket.com Profile
NBB Player Profile 

1990 births
Living people
2019 FIBA Basketball World Cup players
ABA League players
Associação Limeirense de Basquete players
Brazilian expatriate basketball people in Croatia
Brazilian expatriate basketball people in Spain
Brazilian men's basketball players
Basketball players at the 2015 Pan American Games
Basketball players at the 2016 Summer Olympics
CB Gran Canaria players
CB Miraflores players
CB Murcia players
Esporte Clube Pinheiros basketball players
Flamengo basketball players
Franca Basquetebol Clube players
Italian expatriate basketball people in Spain
Italian men's basketball players
KK Cedevita players
Liga ACB players
Medalists at the 2015 Pan American Games
Novo Basquete Brasil players
Olympic basketball players of Brazil
Pan American Games gold medalists for Brazil
Pan American Games medalists in basketball
People from Jundiaí
Shooting guards
Sportspeople from São Paulo (state)